Milorad "Mikan" Sekulović (10 October 1950 – 5 June 2013) was a Serbian football manager and player.

Playing career
Born in Bačko Dobro Polje, Sekulović joined Vrbas in 1971. He spent two seasons at the club, scoring 62 goals in 61 appearances in the Vojvodina League, the third tier of Yugoslav football. After impressive displays with Vrbas, Sekulović moved to Yugoslav First League club Vojvodina in summer 1973. He spent just half a season there, making his debut in the top flight, before returning to Vrbas. In spring 1974, Sekulović netted 13 goals in 16 appearances, helping the side win promotion to the Yugoslav Second League. He was the club's top scorer over the next few seasons, helping them win the Vojvodina League on two more occasions (1976–77 and 1978–79). In the 1981 winter transfer window, Sekulović switched to fellow Second League club AIK Bačka Topola.

Managerial career
After hanging up his boots, Sekulović managed numerous clubs in his homeland, most notably Vrbas (three spells) and Hajduk Kula (1989–1992).

Death
On 5 June 2013, Sekulović died due to illness at the age of 62.

Career statistics

References

Association football forwards
FK TSC Bačka Topola players
FK Hajduk Kula managers
FK Vojvodina players
FK Vrbas managers
FK Vrbas players
People from Vrbas, Serbia
Serbia and Montenegro football managers
Serbian football managers
Serbian footballers
Yugoslav First League players
Yugoslav football managers
Yugoslav footballers
Yugoslav Second League players
1950 births
2013 deaths